Louis Wagner may refer to:

 Louis C. Wagner Jr. (born 1932), United States Army four-star general
 Louis Wagner (driver) (1882–1960), French Grand Prix driver
 Louis Wagner (American general) (1838–1914), German-born American military infantry
 Louis Wagner (murderer) (died 1875), German fisherman murderer